Johannes ("Jan") Aloysius Maria Pieterse (born 29 October 1942) is a former professional racing cyclist from the Netherlands, who won the gold medal in the Men's 100 km Team Trial at the 1964 Summer Olympics, alongside Bart Zoet, Evert Dolman, and Gerben Karstens. At the same Olympics he finished in 42nd place in the Men's Individual Road Race.

See also
 List of Dutch Olympic cyclists

References

External links
  Dutch Olympic Committee

1942 births
Living people
Dutch male cyclists
Cyclists at the 1964 Summer Olympics
Olympic cyclists of the Netherlands
Olympic gold medalists for the Netherlands
People from Oostflakkee
Olympic medalists in cycling
Medalists at the 1964 Summer Olympics
Cyclists from South Holland